A hydrogen infrastructure is the infrastructure of hydrogen pipeline transport, points of hydrogen production and hydrogen stations (sometimes clustered as a hydrogen highway) for distribution as well as the sale of hydrogen fuel, and thus a crucial prerequisite before a successful commercialization of automotive fuel cell technology.

Network

Hydrogen highways
A hydrogen highway is a chain of hydrogen-equipped filling stations and other infrastructure along a road or highway which allow hydrogen vehicles to travel.

Hydrogen stations
Hydrogen stations which are not situated near a hydrogen pipeline get supply via hydrogen tanks, compressed hydrogen tube trailers, liquid hydrogen trailers, liquid hydrogen tank trucks or dedicated onsite production. Some firms as ITM Power are also providing solutions to make your own hydrogen (for use in the car) at home. Government supported activities to expand an hydrogen fuel infrastructure are ongoing in the US state of California, in some member states of the European Union (most notably in Germany) and in particular in Japan.

Hydrogen pipeline transport
Hydrogen pipeline transport is a transportation of hydrogen through a pipe as part of the hydrogen infrastructure. Hydrogen pipeline transport is used to connect the point of hydrogen production or delivery of hydrogen with the point of demand, pipeline transport costs are similar to CNG, the technology is proven, however most hydrogen is produced on the place of demand with every  an industrial production facility.

Buffer for renewable energy
The National Renewable Energy Laboratory believes that US counties have the potential to produce more renewable hydrogen for fuel cell vehicles than the gasoline they consumed in 2002.

As an energy buffer, hydrogen produced via water electrolysis and in combination with underground hydrogen storage or other large-scale storage technologies, could play an important role for the introduction of fluctuating renewable energy sources like wind or solar power.

Hydrogen production plants
The most common method for hydrogen production is steam reforming, accounting for near 50% of the world's hydrogen production. Methods such as electrolysis of water are also used. The world's largest facility for producing electrolytic hydrogen fuel is claimed to be the Fukushima Hydrogen Energy Research Field (FH2R), a 10MW-class hydrogen production unit, inaugurated on 7 March 2020, in Namie, Fukushima Prefecture. The site occupies 180,000 square meters of land, much of which is occupied by a solar array; but power from the grid is also used to conduct electrolysis of water to produce hydrogen fuel.

See also
 HCNG dispenser
 Hydrogen piping
Steam reforming
Water Electrolysis
 Hydrogen economy
Hydrogen technologies
 Underground hydrogen storage

References

External links
 The Hydrogen Infrastructure Transition (HIT) Model
 Roads2HyCom Infrastructure

 
Industrial gases